Tha Din Daeng is a market and one of oldest neighbourhoods in Bangkok. It is in the Somdet Chao Phraya and Khlong San Subdistricts of Khlong San District on the Thonburi side (west bank of the Chao Phraya River).

History
Tha Din Daeng dates back to the early Ayutthaya period (reigns of King Uthong to Intharacha). This area was a stop for cargo ships traveling from the Chao Phraya's mouth to Ayutthaya.

In the Rattanakosin period Tha Din Daeng was considered a prime location for commerce and industry. The area along the Chao Phraya, from Tha Din Daeng to the estuary, was home to many factories and businesses, such as rice mills, sawmills, warehouses, and docks. The traders in the area were mostly Chinese and Malays. King Mongkut (Rama IV) later encouraged European settlements.

Tha Din Daeng is home to many Thai Chinese, like other similar settlements such as Bangkok Chinatown, Yaowarat, Sampheng, Talat Noi, and Talat Phlu. Here there is a ferry that crosses from Rachawong pier (N5) in Sampheng. There are three shrines: Shiva Shrine, Sam Nai Keng Joss House, the oldest Hakka's joss house in Bangkok, built in 1847, and Pung Tao Kong Joss House (本頭公廟).

Tha Din Daeng Road was built in 1931 during King Prajadhipok's (Rama VII) reign after the construction of Memorial bridge linked Phra Nakhon and Thonburi. The road was named by Prince Damrong to recall King Rama I's victories over the Burmese Army (Tha Din Daeng campaign).

Tha Din Daeng is home to many restaurants and street food vendors selling pork satay, pot-stewed goose and duck, milk café, bok kia (a kind of Hainan-style ice dessert), and  Phra ram long song (พระรามลงสรง, rice topped with scalded pork and scalded water spinach and topped with satay sauce and nam phrik phao).

Places
Somdet Chaopraya Institute of Psychiatry
 Tha Din Daeng Market
 Tha Din Daeng Pier 
 Lat Ya Junction & The Royal Thai-Sikhism Arch (the beginning of Itsaraphap and Tha Din Daeng Roads)

References

External links

Neighbourhoods of Bangkok
Khlong San district
Retail markets in Bangkok
Populated places on the Chao Phraya River
Chinese-Thai culture